Julio Ugarte y Ugarte (1890 - 17 August 1949) was a Peruvian writer and founder of the Society of Transcendental Philosophy in Brazil.

Personal life
Julio Ugarte y Ugarte was born in Lima, the son of Luis Ugarte and Fidelia Rosa Ugarte.

Career
On 17 August 1937, Julio Ugarte y Ugarte established the Society of Transcendental Philosophy (School of Christian Initiation) in Brazil. 

In 1939, he wrote The Two Great Spiritual Laws.  He also organized the settling of the Guarita in the State of Rio Grande do Sul, Brazil.  This event was widely covered in the periodical Correio do Povo.

He died in Brazil in 1949.

External links
 Primitive Christian Church in Brazil, in Portuguese
 Biography of Julio Ugarte y Ugarte, in Portuguese
 The Two Great Spiritual Laws, in Portuguese

1890 births
1949 deaths
Ugarte y Ugarte, Julio
Peruvian male writers